Nilay Patel is an American editor and blogger who has been editor-in-chief of technology news website The Verge since 2014.

Education
In 2003, Patel earned a Bachelor of Arts degree in political science from the University of Chicago and in 2006 received his Juris Doctor from the University of Wisconsin Law School.

Career
Patel had his first blogging job at Gapers Block, a Chicago-centric blog. He joined Engadget in 2008 and was responsible for blogging. In 2011 Patel left Engadget along with a few co-workers to join The Verge. In March 2014 he left The Verge to join sister site Vox. In July 2014 he returned to The Verge, and became Editor-in-Chief after Joshua Topolsky left the position to work at Bloomberg.

Patel is also a co-host for The Vergecast.

References

External links 
 

Living people
American bloggers
American podcasters
The Verge
University of Chicago alumni
University of Wisconsin Law School alumni
21st-century American non-fiction writers
Year of birth missing (living people)